Juilliard may refer to:
 Juilliard School, a prominent performing arts conservatory in New York City
 Augustus D. Juilliard (1836–1919), American businessman and philanthropist, whose estate founded the Juilliard School
 Frederic Augustus Juilliard (1868-1937), nephew and heir of Augustus D. Juilliard
 Juilliard v. Greenman, 110 U.S. 421 (1884), a U.S. Supreme Court case brought by Augustus D. Juilliard, upholding the constitutionality of the Legal Tender Acts of 1862 and 1863

See also
 Julliard (disambiguation)